Marcus Spriggs (born July 26, 1976) is a former American football defensive tackle. He played college football at Troy State. He was selected in the 6th round (174th overall) of the 1999 NFL draft by the Cleveland Browns.

College career
Spriggs originally attended Ohio State as a freshman in 1995. As a freshman, he recorded two tackles on the season. He then transferred to Troy for the remainder of his college career.

Professional career
Spriggs was selected in the 6th round (174th overall) of the 1999 NFL draft by the Cleveland Browns, in the inaugural draft class for the returning franchise.

As a rookie, after appearing in 10 games and recording nine total tackles, Spriggs was placed on injured reserve with a shoulder injury.

In 2000, after appearing in the first eight games of the season and recording 11 tackles and two sacks, both sacks came against the Philadelphia Eagles, he was placed on injured reserve again, this time with an arm injury. On May 1, 2002, he was re-signed by the Browns to a one-year contract. He was later released on August 27, 2002 during training camp. On January 14, 2003, he was signed by the Houston Texans. He was released six months later.

References

1976 births
Living people
American football defensive tackles
Ohio State Buckeyes football players
Troy Trojans football players
Cleveland Browns players
Houston Texans players
Players of American football from Washington, D.C.